Tohru Mogami from Selete, Inc. in Tsukuba, Japan was named a Fellow of the Institute of Electrical and Electronics Engineers (IEEE) in 2012 for his work in surface-channel pMOSFET and nanoscale transistor technology.

References

Fellow Members of the IEEE
Living people
Japanese electrical engineers
Year of birth missing (living people)
Place of birth missing (living people)